The 2010 ITF Men's Circuit is the 2010 edition of the third tier tour for men's professional tennis. It is organised by the International Tennis Federation and is a tier below the ATP Challenger Tour. During January/March 2010 over 80 tournaments were played with the majority being played in January.

Key

January

February

March

See also
2010 ITF Men's Circuit
2010 ITF Men's Circuit (April–June)
2010 ITF Men's Circuit (July–September)
2010 ITF Men's Circuit (October–December)
2010 ATP World Tour
2010 ATP Challenger Tour

References

 01-03